Jerri Bergström (born 12 March 1963) is a Swedish fencer. He competed in the épée events at the 1984, 1988 and 1992 Summer Olympics.

References

External links
 

1963 births
Living people
Swedish male épée fencers
Olympic fencers of Sweden
Fencers at the 1984 Summer Olympics
Fencers at the 1988 Summer Olympics
Fencers at the 1992 Summer Olympics
Sportspeople from Stockholm
20th-century Swedish people